Hendrik Weber (born 1975 in Bad Wildungen, Germany), better known as Pantha du Prince, Panthel, and Glühen 4 is a German producer, composer and conceptual artist for electro, techno, house, minimal, and noise, affiliated with Dial Records, and Rough Trade Records.

Career

Weber's style evolved from the harder end of the house music spectrum and minimal techno to something he described himself as "sonic house," and incorporating acoustic elements, electronically altered field recordings, and shoegazing references. He launched his Pantha du Prince identity in 2002, with the four-track 12" "Nowhere". His first full-length album Diamond Daze (2004), featured hard-edged club songs, with samples of The Chills’ "Pink Frost" on the track "Circle Glider". Writing for allmusic, Jason Birchmeier also detected an affinity for shoegaze bands such as My Bloody Valentine and Slowdive, as well as stylings of Detroit Techno producer Carl Craig.

Weber's 2005 remix 12" "Butterfly Girl Versions" and the 2006 "Lichten/Walden" 12" were again published on the German label Dial. In 2007, Weber released This Bliss where he explored travel, time, and the joy of forward motion. Commenting on the album's juxtaposition of ethereal melodic elements and a dance music backbone, Tim Finney gave it 7.7 out of 10 in a review for Pitchfork. The New York Times critic Jon Caramanica described This Bliss as Pantha du Prince's "high-water mark, [and] a pensive, slender and tough album".

In 2010, Weber switched to Rough Trade Records before releasing his third album Black Noise, where he sought to "incorporate a wide range of sounds — field recordings, atonal noise, and stray percussion," as part of a "period of musical exploration in the Swiss Alps." Unlike a totalizing experience of This Bliss, some saw tracks on Black Noise as a more compartmentalized treatment of moods and textures that retained Weber's "gift for generating heavily melodic mazes of sound." Featuring Animal Collective's Noah Lennox and LCD Soundsystem's Tyler Pope as guest artists, and following the aforementioned label change, Black Noise was met with more excitement than Weber's previous work.

In 2012, Pantha Du Prince collaborated with Stephan Abry of the band Workshop; the duo formed the project Ursprung (after an Austrian town), and released an album Ursprung on Dial. In 2013, Pantha du Prince and the Norwegian percussion five-piece The Bell Laboratory released their collaborative album Elements of Light. The ambitious project was a symphony for electronics, percussion and bell carillon, a three-tonne instrument comprising 50 bronze bells. When asked if there was anything he wanted listeners to take away from Elements of Light, Weber said, "It was intended to be listened to in one piece [...], more like a DJ mix."

Due to his integral approach, Pantha du Prince manages to unite different areas of cultural production including popular music, performance, and fine arts to one artform. Weber's installations coalesce sounds, architecture, and objects into a transcendental space.

Discography

As Pantha du Prince

Albums
 2004: Diamond Daze
 2007: This Bliss 
 2010: Black Noise 
 2013: Elements of Light (with the Bell Laboratory)
 2016: The Triad
 2017: The Triad Remix Versions
 2017: The Triad Ambient Versions
 2020: Conference of Trees
 2022: Garden Gaia

Singles/EPs 
 2002: "Nowhere" 
 2005: "Butterfly Girl Versions"
 2006: "Lichten/Walden" 
 2009: "Behind the Stars"
 2009: "The Splendour"
 2010: "Stick to My Side"
 2010: "Lay in a Shimmer"
 2015: "The Winter Hymn"
 2017: "Mondholz : Remixes & Canons" (with Arash Safaian)

Compilations 
 2011: XI Versions of Black Noise
 2011: V Versions of Black Noise
 2017: Coming Home

As Glühen 4

Albums
 2003: Das Schweigen der Sirenen

As Ursprung

Albums
 2012: Ursprung

As Hendrik Weber

Albums
 2021: 429 Hz Formen von Stille

Selected exhibitions and shows

Single exhibitions
 2004: Death by a light of a phonograph at Nomadenoase, Hamburg
 2007: Eisenkaute at Nomadenoase, Hamburg
 2010: Transitory Triplet at Splace Berlin, Fernsehturm am Alexanderplatz, Berlin
 2010: Pantha du Prince at Gallery of Modern Art Brisbane, Australia
 2013: Pantha du Prince & The Bell Laboratory at Queen Elizabeth Hall, South Bank Center London

Group exhibitions
 2005: No competitive offers Dial at ARTIS, Den Bosch, Netherlands
 2010: Based in Berlin at Kunstwerke, Berlin
 2013: in C by Terry Riley, Pantha du Prince & The Bell Laboratory im Barbican, London

Curatorial engagement
2011: Kunst als Klang at Vittorio Manalese, Berlin

Awards
 2011: Echo in the category „Kritikerpreis“
 2014: Musicboard Berlin – Grant Recipient of the Villa Aurora in Los Angeles

References

External links

 Official Website
 Official Myspace
 [ Pantha du Prince] at Allmusic
 Pantha du Prince on Discogs

1975 births
German electronic musicians
Living people
Dark ambient musicians